In Norse cosmology, Muspelheim, also called Muspell, is a realm of fire.

The etymology of "Muspelheim" is uncertain, but may come from Mund-spilli, "world-destroyers", "wreck of the world".

Narrative 
Muspelheim is described as a hot and glowing land of fire, home to the fire giants, and guarded by Surtr, with his flaming sword. It is featured in both the creation and destruction stories of Norse myth. According to the Prose Edda, a great time before the earth was made, Niflheim existed. Inside Niflheim was a well called Hvergelmir, from this well flowed numerous streams known as the Élivágar. Their names were Svol, Gunnthro, Form, Finbul, Thul, Slid and Hrid, Sylg and Ylg, Vid, Leipt and Gjoll.

After a time these streams had traveled sufficiently far from their source in Niflheim, that the venom that flowed within them hardened and turned to ice. When this ice eventually settled, rain rose up from it, and froze into rime. This ice then began to layer itself over the primordial void, Ginnungagap. This made the northern portion of Ginungagap thick with ice, and storms begin to form within.

In the southern region of Ginnungagap, however, glowing sparks were still flying out of Muspelheim. When the heat and sparks from Muspelheim met the ice, it began to melt. The sparks would go on to create the Sun, Moon, and stars, and the drops of melted ice would form the primeval being Ymir: "By the might of him who sent the heat, the drops quickened into life and took the likeness of a man, who got the name Ymir. But the Frost giants call him Aurgelmir".

The Prose Edda section Gylfaginning foretells that the sons of Muspell will break the Bifröst bridge as part of the events of Ragnarök:

Depictions in popular culture

Muspelheim – called "Surt's sea of fire" – is mentioned in Hans Christian Andersen's fairy tale "The Marsh King's Daughter."

Muspelheim appears in different kinds of Marvel Entertainment media.

 Muspelheim is a realm in the Marvel Comics universe. 
 In the Marvel Cinematic Universe, Muspelheim is first depicted in Thor: The Dark World (2013) during the Convergence and later in Thor: Ragnarok (2017). Muspelheim is depicted as a dyson sphere with rocky terrain.
 Muspelheim appears in Spider-Man and His Amazing Friends when Loki uses the Twins of the Gods to teleport Iceman to the Sea of Flame in Muspelheim.

The game Puzzle & Dragons features a monster entitled Flamedragon Muspelheim and Infernodragon Muspelheim.

In the game God of War, players can travel to Muspelheim where they can complete the six Trials of Muspelheim. When completing each trial, the player will receive rewards and will advance Kratos and Atreus closer to the top of a large volcano.

In the Dawn of Ragnarök expansion for Ubisoft's Assassin's Creed Valhalla, Surtr and massive armies of muspels from Muspelheim invade the dwarven realm of Svartalfheim, infecting large parts of it with pools and streams of magma.  

In the mobile game Fire Emblem Heroes, the land of Muspell is a prevalent part of the game's second book, which heavily features the battle between Muspell and Niflheim.

In the MMORPG Dark Age of Camelot there are three different realms based on different mythologies the players can choose to play in, one of them is called Midgard and is based on the Norse mythology. In Midgard there is a large region called Muspelheim which is an ashen wasteland with rivers of lava populated largely by giants and fire elemental beings.

See also
Muspilli
Norse cosmology

Notes

References

External links 
 

Locations in Norse mythology
Ymir
Fire in religion